State Circle is a circular road surrounding Capital Hill in the centre of Canberra, Australia's capital city. It is the outermost of the three concentric roads on the hill, with Capital Circle and Parliament Drive located within State Circle. Capital Circle is a bi-directional four-lane road with most intersections being signalised and at-grade. The speed limit is 70 km/h.

It is named for the states of Australia. Roads named for each of Australia's state capitals are also among those that intersect or terminate at State Circle. The main roads leading from the circle are Commonwealth Avenue, Kings Avenue, Adelaide Avenue, and Canberra Avenue.

State Circle featured prominently on Walter Burley Griffin's plans for Canberra. It was originally envisaged there would be a number of circular concentric roads around Capital Hill. Only Capital Circle and State Circle were ever fully completed. It is considered a main avenue, and a road of national significance, by the National Capital Authority.

Intersections & Interchanges
As State Circle is a circular road, the table below lists all intersections and interchanges starting at Commonwealth Avenue interchange and proceeding clockwise.

See also

References

Streets in Canberra